Paul-Marie François Rousset, Ist. del Prado (August 27, 1921 – January 9, 2016), was a French prelate of the Roman Catholic Church.

Rousset was born in Grièges and was ordained a priest on February 24, 1945 from the religious order of Ist. del Prado. Rousset was appointed titular bishop of the Utimma as well as auxiliary archbishop of the Archdiocese of Lyon on January 24, 1966. He was ordained a bishop on March 6, 1966. Rousset was appointed bishop of Saint-Étienne on February 23, 1971 and resigned from the diocese on September 28, 1987. He died on January 9, 2016.

References

External links
Catholic-Hierarchy
Diocese of Saint-Étienne
Archdiocese of Lyon

1921 births
2016 deaths
People from Grièges
French Roman Catholic titular bishops
20th-century Roman Catholic bishops in France